The Men's Allam British Open 2016 is the men's edition of the 2016 British Open Squash Championships, which is a PSA World Series event (Prize money : 150,000 $). The event took place at the Sports Arena in Hull in England from 21 to 27 March. Mohamed El Shorbagy won his second British Open trophy, beating Ramy Ashour in the final.

Prize money and ranking points
For 2016, the prize purse was $150,000. The prize money and points breakdown is as follows:

Seeds

Draw and results

See also
2016 Women's British Open Squash Championship
2016 Men's World Open Squash Championship

References

External links
PSA British Open 2016 page
British Open 2016 official website

2010s in Kingston upon Hull
Men's British Open Squash
Men's British Open
Men's British Open Squash Championship
Men's British Open Squash Championships
Men's sport in the United Kingdom
Sport in Kingston upon Hull
Squash in England